California's 9th district may refer to:

 California's 9th congressional district
 California's 9th State Assembly district
 California's 9th State Senate district